The Territorial Army and Militia Act 1921 (11 & 12 Geo. V, c. 37) was an Act of Parliament of the Parliament of the United Kingdom affecting the reserves of the British Army It modified the Territorial and Reserve Forces Act 1907, renaming the existing Territorial Force as the "Territorial Army" and the Special Reserve as the "Militia", and updated or repealed a number of outdated regulations.

The Act primarily served to rename the two organisations, which had been announced as a government policy the previous year, and ensure that all regulations and legislation referring to the two were updated. The renaming provoked some controversy and confusion, particularly as the original use of "Militia" had only been abolished fourteen years earlier, but it was argued that the role of a "Militia" was clearer and more readily understood by the public than that of a "Special Reserve".

The Act also served to abolish the "legislative lumber", as it was termed by Viscount Peel, the previous Under-Secretary of State for War, of the old Militia and Yeomanry Acts which were still nominally in force. The eighteenth and nineteenth-century system of a locally conscripted Militia and volunteer Yeomanry had been effectively abolished by the Territorial and Reserve Forces Act 1907, and all the organised units had been dissolved or transferred to the new system, but the legislative framework still existed. The Act thus abolished these powers as no longer necessary or appropriate.

References

United Kingdom Acts of Parliament 1921
1921 in military history
20th-century history of the British Army
Army Reserve (United Kingdom)
20th-century military history of the United Kingdom
United Kingdom military law